The 1997 Kilkenny Senior Hurling Championship was the 103rd staging of the Kilkenny Senior Hurling Championship since its establishment by the Kilkenny County Board. The championship began on 16 August 1997 and ended on 12 October 1997.

Young Irelands were the defending champions.

On 12 October 1997, Dunnamggin won the title after a 2–10 to 2–07 defeat of Young Irelands in the final at Nowlan Park. It was their first ever championship title.

D. J. Carey from the Young Irelands club was the championship's top scorer with 3–16.

Team changes

To Championship

Promoted from the Kilkenny Intermediate Hurling Championship
 O'Loughlin Gaels

From Championship

Relegated to the Kilkenny Intermediate Hurling Championship
 John Locke's

Results

First round

Relegation play-offs

Quarter-finals

Semi-finals

Final

Championship statistics

Top scorers

Overall

Single game

References

Kilkenny Senior Hurling Championship
Kilkenny Senior Hurling Championship